"Silver and Gold" is a song recorded by the American country music artist Dolly Parton.  It was released in May 1991 as the second single from the album Eagle When She Flies.

Background
The song reached number 15 on the Billboard Hot Country Singles & Tracks chart. The song was written by Carl Perkins, Greg Perkins and Stan Perkins.

Chart performance

Year-end charts

References

1991 singles
1991 songs
Dolly Parton songs
Songs written by Carl Perkins
Song recordings produced by Steve Buckingham (record producer)
Columbia Records singles
Music videos directed by Deaton-Flanigen Productions